"Broadway Rag" is a rag composed by James Scott and published as sheet music by Stark Music in 1922.

The structure is:
Intro AA BB A Trio-Intro CC BB

References

1922 songs
Rags
Compositions for solo piano
Songs with music by James Scott (composer)